Coyote Creek is a stream in Ventura County, California, United States which feeds Lake Casitas. It is a major tributary of the Ventura River.

References

Rivers of Ventura County, California
Rivers of Southern California